Edenvale is a neighborhood of San Jose, California, in South San Jose.

History

Edenvale was once a town, named with reference to the Garden of Eden, because of the beauty and fertility of the place.

One of the oldest buildings in the area is Hayes Mansion. The Union Pacific Railroad and historic Monterey Road runs through the area, which is also known as El Camino Real.  The railroad line carries Amtrak's "Coast Starlight."

The most popular recent history of the neighborhood includes Frontier Village, which was an amusement park operated from 1961 to 1980. Most of the land was redeveloped into residential housing.

Geography

Edenvale is located in South San Jose. It is bound by Seven Trees to its north, Blossom Valley to its south/west, Santa Teresa to its south/east, and the Silver Creek Hills to its east.

It is one of the neighborhoods inside San Jose district 2.

Parks

Parks, libraries, and other public areas of interest include:
 Hayes Mansion
 Edenvale Garden Park
 Great Oaks Park
 Danna Rock Park
 Coyote Creek Park
 Hellyer Lake Park 
 Martial Cottle Park

Education

The following are schools located in the Edenvale area:
 Valley Christian High School
 Caroline Davis Intermediate School
 Christopher Elementary School
 Stipe Elementary School
 Edenvale Elementary School
 Hayes Elementary School
 Andrew P. Hill High School

The public schools are in the Oak Grove School District (San Jose, California) and the East Side Union High School District.

References

External links

 San Jose Strong Neighborhood Initiative for Edenvale
 Edenvale Roundtable Community Association
 Edenvale Branch Library

External links

Neighborhoods in San Jose, California